The 1914 FA Cup final was a football match between Burnley and Liverpool on 25 April 1914 at Crystal Palace, London. It was the final match of the 1913–14 FA Cup, the 43rd season of the country's primary cup competition, the Football Association Challenge Cup, better known as the FA Cup. Both teams were appearing in their first final.

Both teams entered the competition in the first round. Burnley's matches ranged from comfortable victories to close affairs. They beat Bolton Wanderers 3–0 in the third round, but beat Sheffield United 1–0 in a replay of their semi-final which finished 0–0. Liverpool matches were generally close affairs, two of their five ties went to a replay. Apart from a 5–1 victory in their third round replay against West Ham United, their biggest margin of victory was by two goals.

Watched by a crowd of 72,778, including King George V, who became the first reigning monarch to attend a FA Cup Final and to present the trophy to the winners, the first half was goalless. Burnley opened the scoring the 57th minute, when ex-Evertonian Bert Freeman scored. Liverpool could not find an equaliser in the remaining minutes and Burnley won the match 1–0 to win their first and to date only FA Cup.

The match was the last FA Cup Final to be played at Crystal Palace.

Match

Details

References

SpecificGeneral
Line ups
FA Cup Final kits

1914
FA Cup
Burnley F.C. matches
Liverpool F.C. matches
April 1914 sports events
1914 sports events in London